Lynbreck Croft is a  farm near Tomintoul in the Highlands of Scotland. The land is held under crofting tenure and the activities of start-up farmers Lynn Cassells and Sandra Baer were showcased on the BBC programme This Farming Life in 2019. The property enjoys the “magnificent backdrop of the Cairngorms”.

Farming activities

They practice regenerative agriculture using rotational grazing and see themselves as “nature friendly farmers”. They have planted up to 30,000 trees on the croft and as of 2019 they have nine Highland cattle, 70  laying hens, 12 rare breed Oxford Sandy and Black pigs and 6 beehives.

Media interest and awards
In 2018 they won Best Crofting Newcomer awarded by the Scottish Crofting Federation at the Spirit of Crofting Festival and the Cairngorms Nature Farm Award awarded by the Cairngorms National Park Authority.

In 2019 Cassells and Baer (who come from Irish and Swiss backgrounds respectively) featured in the third series of  This Farming Life in 2019 from episode 3 onwards. Interviewed about the filming, they said: “It was a terrifying experience to begin with, as we were doing everything for the first time and we were doing it in front of cameras”.

In 2019 they also won the Nature of Scotland Food and Farming Award, sponsored by The James Hutton Institute and were the UK winners of the Newbie award for innovative new entrants.

Notes

Citations

References
Taylor, Claire (30 November 2019) “TFL”s Lynn and Sandra: Building a diverse and profitable croft”. The Scottish Farmer. Glasgow. Retrieved 7 December 2019

External links
 Lynbreck Croft website
 ‘’This Farming Life’’ at BBC2

Badenoch and Strathspey
Farms in Scotland
Crofting
Organic farming in the United Kingdom
Environmentalism in Scotland